The England cricket team toured South Africa in January and February 2023 to play three One Day International (ODI) matches. These matches formed part of the inaugural 2020–2023 ICC Cricket World Cup Super League, having been postponed during England's tour of South Africa in December 2020 due to a COVID-19 outbreak. The first two matches were played in Bloemfontein, and the last match in Kimberley.

England lost the opening ODI by 27 runs despite a century for Jason Roy helping them to 146/0 inside 20 overs, chasing South Africa's total of 298/7. South Africa completed their third-highest successful ODI chase in the second match, with a Temba Bavuma century leading them past England total of 342/7. In the third ODI, England recovered from 14/3 as Jos Buttler (131) and Dawid Malan (118) added 232 runs for the fourth wicket with team accelerating to a total of 346/7; Jofra Archer then took six wickets to complete a 59-run victory for the visitors.

Squads

ODI series

1st ODI

2nd ODI

3rd ODI

Notes

References

External links
 Series home at ESPNcricinfo

2021 in South African cricket
International cricket competitions in 2022–23